2,4-dihydroxy-1,4-benzoxazin-3-one-glucoside dioxygenase (BX6 (gene), DIBOA-Glc dioxygenase) is an enzyme with systematic name (2R)-4-hydroxy-3-oxo-3,4-dihydro-2H-1,4-benzoxazin-2-yl beta-D-glucopyranoside:oxygen oxidoreductase (7-hydroxylating). This enzyme catalyses the following chemical reaction

 (2R)-4-hydroxy-3-oxo-3,4-dihydro-2H-1,4-benzoxazin-2-yl beta-D-glucopyranoside + 2-oxoglutarate + O2  (2R)-4,7-dihydroxy-3-oxo-3,4-dihydro-2H-1,4-benzoxazin-2-yl beta-D-glucopyranoside + succinate + CO2 + H2O

The enzyme is involved in the biosynthesis of protective and allelopathic benzoxazinoids in some plants.

References

External links 
 

EC 1.14.20